The 1948 FIFA Youth Tournament, was the first edition of what would later be called the UEFA European Under-19 Championship an annually international men's football tournament organised by FIFA. It was held in England from 15 to 17 April 1948 with five different venues holding the matches. Eight teams competed in a knockout competition with England defeating the Netherlands 3–2 in the final.

Teams
The following teams entered the tournament:

 
 
  (host)
  (FAI)
 
 
  (IFA)

First round

Supplementary Round
In this round the losing teams from the first round participated.

Semi-finals

Fifth-place match

Third place match

Final

External links
Results by RSSSF

1948
1948
1947–48 in European football
1947–48 in English football
1947–48 in Irish association football
1947–48 in Dutch football
1947–48 in Italian football
1947–48 in Austrian football
1947–48 in Belgian football
1947–48 in Northern Ireland association football
1947–48 in Welsh football
April 1948 sports events in the United Kingdom
1948 in youth association football